= Kokoteasua =

Kokoteasua, also written Kokoteasua or KokotAasua is a town located in the Ashanti Region of Ghana. The community of Aputuogya is located in the Ahafo Ano South district. Kokoteasua is located close to both Onyamebekyere and the neighborhood of Brahabebome.

== Geospatial location ==
Kokoteasua can be found on the map with geocodes; Latitude; 6° 48' 26" N and on Longitude; 1° 57' 44" W
